John Bennet may refer to:
John Bennet (composer) (c. 1575 – after 1614), English composer
John Bennet (judge) (1552/3–1627),  English judge and MP accused of corruption
John Bennet (preacher) (1714–1759), English Methodist preacher
John Bennet (MP) (1628–1663), English landowner and politician
John Bennet, 1st Baron Ossulston (1616–1695), English statesman
John Bennet (archaeologist) (born 1957), British archaeologist and Professor of Aegean Archaeology at Sheffield University
John Bennet, 5th Baronet of the Bennet baronets

See also
John Bennet Lawes (1814–1900), English entrepreneur and agricultural scientist
John Bennett (disambiguation)